Frigerio is an Italian surname that may refer to
Alessandro Frigerio (1914–1979), Swiss-Colombian football forward 
Andrea Frigerio (born 1961), Argentine actress and television presenter
Angelo Frigerio, Italian bobsledder 
Bartolomeo Frigerio (1585–1636), Italian Roman Catholic prelate 
Carlo Frigerio (1763–1800), Italian painter 
David Frigerio, American screenwriter 
Ezio Frigerio (born 1930), Italian costume designer and art director 
Fausto Frigerio (born 1966), Italian hurdler and long jumper 
Luciano Frigerio (1928–1999), Italian designer, artist and musician 
Roberto Frigerio (born 1938), Swiss football forward 
Rogelio Frigerio (born 1970), Argentine economist and politician, grandson of Rogelio Julio Frigerio
Rogelio Julio Frigerio (1914–2006), Argentine economist, journalist and politician 
Ugo Frigerio (1901–1968), Italian race walker

See also
Cantono Frigerio system, an Italian electric power supply for trackless trolleybuses 

Italian-language surnames